The M2, officially referred to as the M2 Yenikapı–Hacıosman metro line, is a rapid transit line of the Istanbul Metro. It is colored light green on the maps and route signs. The M2 operates between Hacıosman in southern Sarıyer to Yenikapı in south-central Fatih on the historic peninsula of Istanbul. Shuttle trains run from Sanayi to Seyrantepe to Nef Stadium. A daily ridership of about 500,000 makes it the busiest line of the Istanbul Metro system.

History
Construction for a north–south metro line started on 19 August 1992 when the groundbreaking of the M2 took place. The original route was a wholly underground  line between Taksim and 4. Levent. Construction of the tunnels took place in three separate areas; Taksim, Şişli and 4. Levent. These tunnels were connected to each other on 8 July 1994 and were completed on 30 April 1995. The line was completed in early 11 January 1999 and the first rolling stock were lowered into the tunnels. On 25 March 1999 the first test runs began and the line entered service on 16 September 2000 between Taksim and Levent. 4. Levent was opened one month later on 24 October 2000.

Timeline
The following are events in the timeline of the M2 service:

 19 August 1992: Construction of the M2 begins.
 12 June 1994: Taksim - Şişli part is completed.
 8 July 1994: Şişli - 4.Levent part is completed.
 30 April 1995: The two tunnels are connected.
 11 January 1999: The first trainsets are used for test runs.
 16 September 2000: Taksim - 4.Levent portion is opened.
 31 January 2009: Taksim - Şişhane and 4.Levent - Atatürk Oto Sanayi extensions are opened.
 2 September 2010: A northern extension to Darüşşafaka is opened.
 11 November 2010: The branch to Seyrantepe is opened.
 29 April 2011: The northern extension to Hacıosman is opened.
 15 February 2014: With the completion of the Golden Horn Metro Bridge, M2 line is fully in service from Yenikapı to Hacıosman.

Route

The M2 starts at Hacıosman in southwestern Sarıyer. From there it travels under Büyükdere Avenue, a major north–south road in the city, through İstanbul's two major financial districts; Maslak and Levent. The line then heads slightly west just south of Levent through Şişli to historical Taksim Square. From there M2 heads through western Beyoğlu to Şişhane. It crosses the Golden Horn towards the Old City and terminates in Yenikapı, a transport hub connecting with M1 line and Marmaray. (The Şehzadebaşı station on the map above was actually named Vezneciler when the extension south of Şişhane opened on 15 February 2014).

Stations

M2 Line

M2 Branch Line

(While it was planned to be only a warehouse and operation center in Seyrantepe during the initial construction, it was built as a station to serve both the region and the Türk Telekom Stadium. Due to the limited area of the scissors zone, transactions can only be made up to the Sanayi. It is planned to make arrangements for uninterrupted work between Seyrantepe and Yenikapı on match days.)

Rolling stock

The M2 line in İstanbul uses both Hyundai Rotem  and Alstom trains which operate with headways of 5 minutes on the line.

Future extension
A future extension southwest of Yenikapı is planned, with five new stations at Kocamustafapaşa, Silivrikapı, Veliefendi, Zeytinburnu and Bakırköy.

Gallery

See also 
 Golden Horn Metro Bridge
 Istanbul modern tramways
 Istanbul nostalgic tramways
 Public transport in Istanbul
 İstanbul Metropolitan Municipality
 Metro İstanbul

References

External links 

 

M2
Railway lines opened in 2000
Fatih
Beyoğlu
Şişli
Beşiktaş
Kağıthane
Sarıyer
2000 establishments in Turkey